Candy Cigarettes & Cap Guns is the first studio album from folk punk band Andrew Jackson Jihad. The album was released by The Audioconfusion Manifesto in 2005.

Track listing

Personnel

Andrew Jackson Jihad
Sean Bonnette - lead vocals, guitar
Ben Gallaty - bass, backing vocals
Justin James White – drums, percussion

Additional Personnel
Mark Greer - mastering
Jalipaz Nelson - recording
Djentrification - artwork, layout

References

2005 albums
AJJ (band) albums